OVS (formerly Oviesse) is an Italian clothing company. 
It has stores in 35 countries in Europe, Latin America and Asia with a total of about 1285 locations. Revenues were €1.32 billion in 2015.
It is the largest clothing retailer in Italy, accounting for about 5% of the national clothing retail market.

OVS was founded in 1972 as Organizzazione Vendite Speciali (special sales organization), a division of Coin, an Italian department store chain. The company remained a subsidiary of Coin Group until 2015, when an initial public offering (IPO) took place.

Locations

References

Italian brands
Italian companies established in 1972
Companies based in Veneto
Clothing brands of Italy
Clothing retailers of Italy
Clothing companies of Italy
Clothing companies established in 1972
Manufacturing companies of Italy
Eyewear brands of Italy
Shoe companies of Italy
Watch manufacturing companies of Italy